Armand-François Le Bourgeois (1911–2005) was bishop of Autun in central France from 1966 until his retirement in 1987. The last bishop of Autun to wear the pallium, he was prominent in ecumenical relations. He chaired an episcopal committee that decided to offer communion in Catholic Churches to Anglicans who found themselves out of reach of their own church in France.

External links
 Catholic Hierarchy page
  Obituary

1911 births
2005 deaths
Bishops of Autun
20th-century Roman Catholic bishops in France
People from Annecy